Nancy Bauer, née Nancy Luke (born July 7, 1934) is a Canadian writer and editor who writes for a number of Canadian maritime magazines about people who write, produce crafts and create visual art.

Born in Chelmsford, Massachusetts, the daughter of Grace Bridgeford and Wendell Luke, Bauer received her B.A. in English from Mount Holyoke College in 1956.
She moved to Fredericton, New Brunswick in 1965.

From 1967 until 1983, Bauer was the publisher of 25 New Brunswick Chapbooks.
She founded the Maritime Writers Workshop, and has served as writer-in-residence at the University of New Brunswick, the Cape Cod Writers Conference, East Word One, and Bemidji State University.

She was married to Bill Bauer, writer and retired professor, until his death in 2010.

Awards
1982: 2nd prize, CBC Literary Competition
1999: Alden Nowlan Award for Excellence in the Literary Arts

Selected bibliography
"Finding a pattern with soothing words", New Brunswick Telegraph-Journal, February 6th, 2010
"A matter of joining forces", New Brunswick Telegraph-Journal, April 25th, 2009 
1982:Flora, Write this Down. Fredericton: Goose Lane Editions, .
1985:Wise Ears. Ottawa: Oberon, .
1988:The Opening Eye. Ottawa: Oberon, .
1991:Samara, the Wholehearted. Fredericton: Goose Lane Editions, .
1994:The Irrational Doorways of Mr. Gerard. Fredericton: Goose Lane Editions, .

References

External links
 Home Page of Nancy Bauer

1934 births
Living people
Mount Holyoke College alumni
Writers from Fredericton
Writers from Boston
University of New Brunswick
Canadian women non-fiction writers
Canadian women novelists
Canadian women short story writers
20th-century Canadian non-fiction writers
20th-century Canadian novelists
20th-century Canadian short story writers
20th-century Canadian women writers
Chelmsford High School alumni